"Kids Again" is a song by British singer Sam Smith, released through Capitol Records on 30 October 2020 as the third single from their third studio album, Love Goes (2020). The song was written by Sam Smith, Ryan Tedder, Ali Tamposi, Andrew Wotman and Louis Bell.

Music video
The music video, directed by Alasdair McLellan, premiered on YouTube on 30 October 2020.

Composition

When Sam Smith was interviewed by Clara Amfo for BBC Sounds both remarked that there are echoes of 1970s and 1980s music, and particularly the work of Fleetwood Mac in this track. It is, Sam commented, different in style to anything else on the album.

Sam added that “this is a bridge to my next record”, expressing the intention to move on from the style of Love Goes to involve themself more in the intricacies of production and “rootsy queer soul”.

Personnel
Credits adapted from Tidal.
 Andrew Watt – Producer, composer, associated performer, background vocalist, bass guitar, drums, guitar, percussion
 Louis Bell – Producer, composer, associated performer, keyboards, programming
 Ali Tamposi – Composer, lyricist, associated performer, background vocalist
 Ryan Tedder – Composer, associated performer, background vocalist, keyboards
 Sam Smith – Composer, lyricist, associated performer, vocals
 Chris Bolster – Immersive Mix Engineer
 Randy Merrill – Mastering Engineer, studio personnel
 Mark Stent – Mixer, studio personnel

Charts

Release history

References

2020 songs
Sam Smith (singer) songs
Songs written by Ali Tamposi
Songs written by Andrew Watt (record producer)
Songs written by Louis Bell
Songs written by Ryan Tedder
Songs written by Sam Smith (singer)
Song recordings produced by Louis Bell
Song recordings produced by Ryan Tedder